Acacia argyrotricha is a shrub of the genus Acacia and the subgenus Plurinerves that is endemic to north eastern Australia

Description
Like most species of Acacia it has phyllodes rather than true leaves. The thick evergreen phyllodes have a flattened linear shape and are straight or slightly sickle shaped. It blooms between September and October producing inflorescences that appear in pairs on a short axillary axis. The spherical flower-heads contain 30 to 40 deep yellow coloured flowers. In December it produces linear shaped seed pods that are raised over the seeds.

Taxonomy
The species was first formally described by the botanist Leslie Pedley in 1999 as part of the work Notes on Acacia (Leguminosae: Mimosoideae) chiefly from northern Australia as publishedin the journal Austrobaileya. Pedley the reclassified it as Racosperma argyrotrichum in 2003 and it was transferred back to genus Acacia in 2006.

Distribution
It is native to a small area on Queensland in the Darling Downs district in the Bracker State Forest south of Inglewood where it is found growing in sandy soils as a part of Eucalyptus woodland communities.

See also
 List of Acacia species

References

argyrotricha
Flora of Queensland
Plants described in 1999
Taxa named by Leslie Pedley